Trevor Horn Reimagines the Eighties is a studio album by English music producer Trevor Horn, released in 2019. It was recorded over about a year.

Track listing
"Everybody Wants to Rule the World" (4:16; originally by Tears for Fears) with Robbie Williams
"Dancing in the Dark" (4:23; originally by Bruce Springsteen) with Gabrielle Aplin
"Ashes to Ashes" (4:17; originally by David Bowie) with Seal
"The Power of Love" (4:27; originally by Frankie Goes to Hollywood and produced by Horn) with Matt Cardle
"It's Different for Girls" (originally by Joe Jackson) with Steve Hogarth
"Slave to the Rhythm" (originally by Grace Jones and produced by Horn) with Rumer
"Brothers in Arms" (originally by Dire Straits) with Simple Minds
"Girls on Film" (originally by Duran Duran) with All Saints
"What's Love Got to Do With It" (originally released by Tina Turner) with Tony Hadley
"Owner of a Lonely Heart" (originally by Yes and produced by Horn)
"Take On Me" (originally by A-ha)
"Blue Monday" (originally by New Order) with Rev. Jimmie Wood
"Cry" (originally by Godley & Creme and co-produced by Horn) with Jamie Squire; Japanese bonus track

Personnel
Robbie Williams – vocals (1)
Gabrielle Aplin – vocals (2)
Seal – vocals (3)
Matt Cardle – vocals (4)
Steve Hogarth – vocals (5)
Rumer – vocals (6)
Jim Kerr – vocals (7)
All Saints – vocals (8)
Tony Hadley – vocals (9)
Trevor Horn – vocals (10, 11)
Jimmie Wood – vocals (12)
Lol Creme – backing vocals (1)
Izzy Chase – backing vocals
Katie Holmes-Smith - backing vocals

Chart positions

References

Albums produced by Trevor Horn
2019 albums
Covers albums